Mastax hargreavesi is a species of beetle in the family Carabidae found in Ivory Coast and Sierra Leone.

References

Mastax hargreavesi
Beetles of Asia
Beetles described in 1931